The British Academy Television Craft Award for Best Emerging Talent: Fiction is one of the categories presented by the British Academy of Film and Television Arts (BAFTA) within the British Academy Television Craft Awards, the craft awards were established in 2000 with their own, separate ceremony as a way to spotlight technical achievements, without being overshadowed by the main production categories. According to the BAFTA website, the category is "designed to recognise potential, awarding those who have begun to capture the attention of their peers through demonstrating exceptional talent and ambition within their craft for the first time in scripted programming."

Several categories have existed to recognize breakthrough talent and new faces in the British television industry:
 From 2001 to 2005, three categories were presented to recognize new writers and directors in television; Best New Writer, Best Director: Factual and Best Director: Fiction.
 In 2006, those categories were transformed into one category that was presented until 2020, Best Breakthrough Talent.
 Also, in 2006 the Anthony Asquith Award for New Composer was presented.

In 2020 it was announced that the category would be split once again for the 2021 ceremony, creating Best Emerging Talent: Fiction and Best Emerging Talent: Factual.

Winners and nominees

2000s
Best New Writer

Best New Director: Factual

Best New Director: Fiction

Anthony Asquith Award for New Composer

Best Breakthrough Talent

2010s
Best Breakthrough Talent

2020s
Best Breakthrough Talent

Best Emerging Talent: Fiction

See also
 British Academy Television Craft Award for Best Emerging Talent: Factual

References

External links
 

Emerging Talent: Fiction